The 2020 LSU Tigers football team represented Louisiana State University in the 2020 NCAA Division I FBS football season. The Tigers played their home games at Tiger Stadium in Baton Rouge, Louisiana, and competed in the West Division of the Southeastern Conference (SEC). They were led by fourth year head coach Ed Orgeron.

The season was not an easy one for LSU, who were the defending national champions. After starting the year with a stunning home loss to Mississippi State, the Tigers were only able to string together five wins. In addition to losing a record 14 players to the NFL draft the year before, All-American wide receiver, Ja'Marr Chase, opted out of play before the season. The Tigers also lost their starting quarterback, Myles Brennan, three games in and had to rely on true freshmen, TJ Finley and Max Johnson, for the remainder of the year. In spite of these obstacles, the Tigers managed to end the season on a positive note with wins over sixth-ranked Florida and Ole Miss, the former as a 24-point underdog. By comparison, LSU had already eclipsed more losses by their seventh game of the season than they had in all of 2018 and 2019 combined. Still, the victories over Florida and Ole Miss allowed LSU to avert its first losing season since 1999, when the Tigers went 3–8. The .500 season is the first for LSU since a 5–5–1 ledger in 1974.

On December 9, LSU announced a self-imposed bowl ban for the 2020 season. Although the Tigers did not finish the season with six wins, the NCAA removed bowl eligibility requirements for the 2020 bowl season. This self-imposed bowl ban was enacted due to an NCAA investigation at LSU over allegations of improper booster payments to their players.

Previous season 
LSU began the year ranked sixth in the preseason AP Poll, and were projected to finish in second in the SEC West behind Alabama. In 2019, the Tigers secured an undefeated regular season that included wins over top-ten-ranked teams Texas, Florida, Auburn, and Alabama. In the SEC Championship Game, LSU defeated Georgia to win their first conference title since 2011. LSU was ranked No. 1 in the final College Football Playoff rankings of the season, earning them a spot in the national semi-final game to be played at the Peach Bowl. They dominated fourth-ranked Oklahoma in that game, 63–28, to advance to the CFP Championship Game. There, they defeated the defending national champions Clemson, 42–25, to secure LSU's fourth claimed national title in school history, the second undefeated champion in the CFP era, and the second 15–0 season among any team in the modern era.

LSU's record-setting offense was led by senior quarterback Joe Burrow, who won the Heisman Trophy by the largest margin in the history of the award, and broke several NCAA FBS records, including most touchdown passes (60), and highest passer rating (202.0). Burrow was drafted first overall in the 2020 NFL draft. He was accompanied on offense by 1,400-yard running back Clyde Edwards-Helaire, and two 1,500-yard receivers Ja'Marr Chase and Justin Jefferson, the former winning the Biletnikoff Award as the best wide receiver in the country. LSU's defense was anchored by two All-American defensive backs in Jim Thorpe Award winner Grant Delpit and true freshman Derek Stingley Jr., while Linebacker Jacob Phillips led the SEC in tackles. Burrow, Edwards-Helaire, and Jefferson were drafted in the first round of the 2020 draft, Delpit was drafted in the second round, while Phillips went in the third. Both Chase and Stingley were not yet eligible to declare for the 2020 draft. Head coach Ed Orgeron was awarded several national Coach of the Year honors.

Preseason

SEC Media Days
In the preseason media poll, LSU was predicted to finish in second in the West Division behind Alabama. LSU received the second-most votes (tied with Georgia) to win the SEC Championship Game.

Schedule
LSU Tigers announced its 2020 football schedule on August 7, 2019. The 2020 schedule consists of 7 home, 4 away, and 1 neutral site game in the regular season.

The Tigers had games scheduled against Nicholls, Rice, Texas, and UTSA, which were all canceled due to the COVID-19 pandemic.

The game between LSU and Missouri was originally scheduled to take place in Baton Rouge.  However, in light of Hurricane Delta, the game was moved to Columbia, Missouri.
The game between LSU and Florida was originally scheduled to take place on October 17.  However, due to COVID-19 management requirements in response to positive tests and subsequent quarantine of individuals within the Florida program, the game was rescheduled for December 12.
Schedule Source:

Personnel

Coaching staff
Current staff as of February 10, 2020

Rankings

Players drafted into the NFL

References

LSU
LSU Tigers football seasons
LSU Tigers football